Formats that use delimiter-separated values (also DSV) store two-dimensional arrays of data by separating the values in each row with specific delimiter characters. Most database and spreadsheet programs are able to read or save data in a delimited format. Due to their wide support, DSV files can be used in data exchange among many applications.

A delimited text file is a text file used to store data, in which each line represents a single book, company, or other thing, and each line has fields separated by the delimiter.
Compared to  the kind of flat file that uses spaces to force every field to the same width, a delimited file has the advantage of allowing field values of any length.

Delimited formats 

Any character may be used to separate the values, but the most common delimiters are the comma, tab, and colon. The vertical bar (also referred to as pipe) and space are also sometimes used. Column headers are sometimes included as the first line, and each subsequent line is a row of data. The lines are separated by newlines.

For example, the following fields in each record are delimited by commas, and each record by newlines:
 "Date","Pupil","Grade"
 "25 May","Bloggs, Fred","C"
 "25 May","Doe, Jane","B"
 "15 July","Bloggs, Fred","A"
 "15 April","Muniz, Alvin ""Hank""","A"

Note the use of the double quote to enclose each field.  This prevents the comma in the actual field value (Bloggs, Fred; Doe, Jane; etc.) from being interpreted as a field separator.  This necessitates a way to "escape" the field wrapper itself, in this case the double quote; it is customary to double the double quotes actually contained in a field as with those surrounding "Hank".  In this way, any ASCII text including newlines can be contained in a field.

ASCII includes several control characters that are intended to be used as delimiters. They are: 28 for File Separator, 29 for Group Separator, 30 for Record Separator, and 31 for Unit Separator. Use of these characters has not achieved widespread adoption; some systems have replaced their control properties with more accepted controls such as CR/LF and TAB.

Uses and applications 

Due to their widespread use, comma- and tab-delimited text files can be opened by several kinds of applications, including most spreadsheet programs and statistical packages, sometimes even without the user designating which delimiter has been used. Despite that each of those applications has its own database design and its own file format (for example, accdb or xlsx), they can all map the fields in a DSV file to their own data model and format.

Typically a delimited file format is indicated by a specification. Some specifications provide conventions for avoiding delimiter collision, others do not. Delimiter collision is a problem that occurs when a character that is intended as part of the data gets interpreted as a delimiter instead. Comma- and space-separated formats often suffer from this problem, since in many contexts those characters are legitimate parts of a data field. Most such files avoid delimiter collision either by surrounding all data fields in double quotes, or only quoting those data fields that contain the delimiter character. One problem with tab-delimited text files is that tabs are difficult to distinguish from spaces; therefore, there are sometimes problems with the files being corrupted when people try to edit them by hand. Another set of problems occur due to errors in the file structure, usually during import of file into a database (in the example above, such error may be a pupil's first name missing).

Depending on the data itself, it may be beneficial to use non-standard characters such as the tilde (~) as delimiters.  With rising prevalence of web sites and other applications that store snippets of code in databases, simply using a " which occurs in every hyperlink and image source tag simply is not sufficient to avoid this type of collision.  Since colons, semi-colons, pipes (|), and many other characters are also used, it can be quite challenging to find a character that is not being used elsewhere.

See also
 Comma-separated values
 Delimiter
 Tab-separated values

Notes and references

Further reading
 (Has file descriptions of delimited ASCII (.DEL) and non-delimited ASCII (.ASC) files for data transfer.)

Delimiter-separated format